The North Park Vikings football program is a college football team that represents North Park University in the College Conference of Illinois and Wisconsin, a part of the NCAA Division III. The team has had at least 17 head coaches since its first recorded football game in 1934, although records for coach names only begin in 1958. The current coach is Kyle Rooker who first took the position for the 2019 season.

Key

Coaches
Statistics correct as of the end of the 2021 college football season.

Notes

References
 
 

North Park Vikings

North Park Vikings head coaches